Transformers: Beast Wars is a spinoff franchise from the larger Transformers franchise.

Beast Wars may also refer to:

 Transformers: Beast Wars (comics), comics based on the franchise
 Beast Wars: Transformers, animated TV series based on the franchise
 Beast Wars: Transformers (video game)

See also
 Beast Machines, a direct sequel to Beast Wars
 Beast Wars II, a 1998 Japanese Transformers anime series
 Beast Wars Neo,  a 1999 Japanese Transformers animated series and toy line
 Transformers (disambiguation)